Alexander the Great Airport may refer to:

Kavala International Airport "Alexander the Great", also known as Kavala International Airport "Megas Alexandros", in Kavala, Macedonia, Greece
Skopje International Airport, named "Skopje Alexander the Great Airport" (Аеродром Александар Велики Скопје) from December 2006 until February 2018, in Skopje, North Macedonia.